George Arthur Bloom (born 1945) is a US-born Canadian screenwriter and producer known for his work on Nelvana television titles such as The Magic School Bus and Cyberchase. He also wrote the pilots for The Transformers and My Little Pony, as well as a number of installments of the My Little Pony series such as My Little Pony 'n Friends and My Little Pony Tales. For over four decades, Bloom has written television and film scripts for children and adults alike.

Television credits
 series head writer denoted in bold

Live-action series
The New Dick Van Dyke Show (1971)
All in the Family (1972)
The Julie Andrews Hour (1972)
Carter Country (1977)
Chico and the Man (1977)
Phyllis (1977)
Welcome Back, Kotter (1977)
Starsky & Hutch (1979)
The Incredible Hulk (1980)
Alice (1981)
Too Close for Comfort (1982)
Love, Sidney (1982-1983)
Condo (1983)
9 to 5 (1983)
Throb (1987)

Animated series
The Transformers (1984)
My Little Pony (1986-1987)
Potato Head Kids (1986)
The Glo Friends (1986-1987)
Jem (1987)
Bucky O'Hare and the Toad Wars (1991)
Conan the Adventurer (1992-1993)
My Little Pony Tales (1992)
Transformers: Generation 2 (1993)
Street Sharks (1994)
Tenko and the Guardians of the Magic (1995)
The Magic School Bus (1995-1997)
G.I. Joe Extreme (1996)
Street Fighter (1996)
Salty’s Lighthouse (1997)
Cyberchase (2002–present)
Space Racers (2017)

Film credits

Live-action
Knife for the Ladies (1974)
The Last Flight of Noah’s Ark (1980)
Shades of Love: Moonlight Flight (1988)
Shades of Love: Sunset Court (1988)
Shades of Love: The Man Who Guards the Greenhouse (1988)
Shades of Love: The Emerald Tear (1988)
Any Day Now (2012)

Animated
The Charmkins (1983)
My Little Pony: The Movie (1986)
Cinderella (1994)
Leo the Lion: King of the Jungle (1994)
Alice in Wonderland (1995)

External links

1945 births
Canadian television writers
Canadian male screenwriters
Canadian television producers
American emigrants to Canada
Living people
20th-century Canadian screenwriters
20th-century Canadian male writers
21st-century Canadian screenwriters
21st-century Canadian male writers